In computational fluid dynamics, the immersed boundary method originally referred to an approach developed by Charles Peskin in 1972 to simulate fluid-structure (fiber) interactions. Treating the coupling of the structure deformations and the fluid flow poses a number of challenging problems for numerical simulations (the elastic boundary changes the flow of the fluid and the fluid moves the elastic boundary simultaneously). In the immersed boundary method the fluid is represented in an Eulerian coordinate system and the structure is represented in Lagrangian coordinates. For Newtonian fluids governed by the Navier–Stokes equations, the fluid equations are

and if the flow is incompressible, we have the further condition that

The physics of the fiber is represented via a fiber force distribution function . Spring forces, bending resistance or any other type of behavior can be built into this term. The force exerted by the structure on the fluid is then interpolated as a source term in the momentum equation using

where  is the Dirac  function. The forcing can be extended to multiple dimensions to model elastic surfaces or three-dimensional solids. Assuming a massless structure, the elastic fiber moves with the local fluid velocity and can be interpolated via the delta function

where  denotes the entire fluid domain. 
Discretization of these equations can be done by assuming an Eulerian grid on the fluid and a separate Lagrangian grid on the fiber. 
Approximations of the Delta distribution by smoother functions will allow us to interpolate between the two grids. 
Any existing fluid solver can be coupled to a solver for the fiber equations to solve the Immersed Boundary equations.
Variants of this basic approach have been applied to simulate a wide variety of mechanical systems involving elastic structures which interact with fluid flows.

Since the original development of this method by Peskin, a variety of approaches have been developed to simulate flow over complicated immersed bodies on grids that do not conform to the surface of the body. These include methods such as the immersed interface method, the Cartesian grid method, the ghost fluid method and the cut-cell method. Mittal and Iaccarino refer to all these (and other related) methods as Immersed Boundary Methods and provide various categorizations of these methods. From the point of view of implementation, they categorize immersed boundary methods into continuous forcing and discrete forcing methods. In the former, a force term is added to the continuous Navier-Stokes equations before discretization, whereas in the latter, the forcing is applied (explicitly or implicitly) to the discretized equations. Under this taxonomy, Peskin's original method is a continuous forcing method whereas Cartesian grid, cut-cell and the ghost-fluid methods are discrete forcing methods.

See also 
Stochastic Eulerian Lagrangian method
Stokesian dynamics
Volume of fluid method
Level-set method
Marker-and-cell method

Software: Numerical codes 
 FloEFD:  Commercial CFD IBM code 
 Advanced Simulation Library
 Mango-Selm : Immersed Boundary Methods and SELM Simulations, 3D Package, (Python interface, LAMMPS MD Integration), P. Atzberger, UCSB
 Stochastic Immersed Boundary Methods in 3D, P. Atzberger, UCSB
 Immersed Boundary Method for Uniform Meshes in 2D, A. Fogelson, Utah
 IBAMR : Immersed Boundary Method for Adaptive Meshes in 3D, B. Griffith, NYU.
 IB2d: Immersed Boundary Method for MATLAB and Python in 2D with 60+ examples, N.A. Battista, TCNJ
 ESPResSo: Immersed Boundary Method for soft elastic objects
 CFD IBM code based on OpenFoam
 sdfibm:  Another CFD IBM code based on OpenFoam
 SimScale: Immersed Boundary Method for fluid mechanics and conjugate heat transfer simulation in the cloud

Notes

References

.

Fluid mechanics
Computational fluid dynamics
Numerical differential equations